Sutton cum Duckmanton is a civil parish in Derbyshire, England, between Bolsover and Chesterfield in the district of North East Derbyshire.

The village has a parish church, a pub, The Arkwright Arms, and a parish council.

Sutton cum Duckmanton contains the villages of Arkwright Town, Duckmanton,  Long Duckmanton, and Sutton Scarsdale. Hamlets include Sutton Spring Wood. The population was 1,582 at the 2011 Census.

The nearest airport is East Midlands Airport and the nearest train and bus stations are in Chesterfield.

History
John Marius Wilson's Imperial Gazetteer of England and Wales (1870–72) said of Sutton-cum-Duckmanton:

The parish registers date from 1662.

Sutton Spring Wood

Sutton Spring Wood (also known as Sutton Springs Woodis a small hamlet in Sutton-cum-Duckmanton parish. The hamlet consists of around 45 houses, in a heavily wooded area, with a road that passes under the A617 road that links it to Temple Normanton. It is linked to Chesterfield via a bus stop located on Moor Lane and it is close to Sutton Scarsdale and Sutton-cum-Duckmanton but these villages are not linked closely by road to Sutton Spring Wood.  There are no shops, pubs or churches in the hamlet. Across the road from the hamlet is Calow Green.

See also
Listed buildings in Sutton cum Duckmanton

References

External links
Parish of Sutton-cum-Duckmanton at British-towns.net
Map of Sutton Spring Wood
Photographs of Sutton Spring Wood

Civil parishes in Derbyshire
Towns and villages of the Peak District